Lake Rotoaira (sometimes written Lake Roto-aira) is a small lake to the south of Lake Taupō on the North Island Volcanic Plateau in New Zealand. It covers an area of 13 km².

Lake Rotoaira is one of the few privately owned lakes in New Zealand being administered by the Lake Rotoaira Trust on behalf of its owners. An access permit must be held by those using the lake for fishing and similar activities.

The lake is located in a graben between the broad volcanic dome of Mount Tongariro to the south and the smaller volcanic peak of Pihanga to the northwest. It is naturally drained by the Poutu Stream into the Tongariro River.

However the Tongariro Power Scheme utilised Rotoaira as a storage lake for the Tokaanu Hydropower Station. Extensive engineering works were carried out including the diversion of a number of other streams (including Whanganui River) into Rotoaira via the Otamangakau Hydro Lake and construction of a tunnel through Pihanga to the Tokaanu Power Station. Damming of the Poutu outlet has created Motuopuhi island, formerly a peninsula.

References

Lecointre, Neall, Wallace and Elliot (2004). Late Quaternary evolution of the Rotoaira Basin, northern Tongariro ring plain, New Zealand, New Zealand Journal of Geology & Geophysics, Vol. 47, 549–565.

Tongariro Volcanic Centre
Rotoaira
Taupō District